Criminal law in France is one of the branches of the juridical system of the French Republic. The field of criminal law is defined as a sector of French law, and is a combination of public and private law, insofar as it punishes private behavior on behalf of society as a whole.

Criminal offenses are divided into three categories, according to increasing severity:   and crimes. The latter two categories are determined by the legislature, while contraventions are the responsibility of the executive branch.

Like the legal systems of other liberal democracies, French criminal law is based on three guiding principles: the principle of legality in criminal law, an illegal act (actus reus), and intent (mens rea). It has been influenced by various legal, ethical, and scientific philosophical movements over the centuries. While most of these influences are national in origin, European courts (such as the Court of Justice of the European Union and the European Court of Human Rights) have also influenced French criminal law. French criminal law was first codified during the French Revolution, resulting in the French Penal Code of 1791. Under the First Empire, Napoleon enacted the Penal Code of 1810, replaced by the French penal code of 1994.

The  and his staff are responsible for the pursuit of legal proceedings and criminal prosecution, in collaboration with the police. The judicial authority pronounces a sentence according to the severity of the acts: imprisonment or detention, fine, day-fine, and so on. The convicted person may appeal the decision to the court of appeal, and, ultimately, to the Court of Cassation.

Background

Dual systems 

France has a dual system of law: one system deals with private relationships, and is sometimes called "private law" or "ordinary law", and the other system which covers administrative officials, and is called "administrative law". This duality is not merely or mainly about covering different domains or legal topics, and in fact, the two systems overlap and deal with some of the same or similar topics. Rather, the duality is about the fact that the authorities which enforce them and which also develop their content are completely autonomous and independent of each other.

The two systems have entirely separate judges, courts, and bodies of written texts which support them, and are known in French as "orders": the "judiciary order" for private law, and the "administrative order" for public law. This separation came about during the French Revolution, when the justice system was established respecting a strict separation of powers in the law of 16–24 august 1790 in particular, article 13.

Administrative order 

The administrative order has jurisdiction (compétence) over cases between the state and public organizations,as well as between individuals and the public organs of government, and thus stands apart from the criminal law system, which is part of the judiciary order.

Judiciary order 

The judiciary system or order, is also known as "ordinary law" and is further divided into two branches: civil law and criminal law.

The main function of criminal law is punishment for infractions, while the main function of civil law is compensation for damages. The main differences are that criminal law seeks to punish or penalize when an infraction against existing law is committed, and is "vertical" in the sense that it comes from the government down towards an individual or legal entity; whereas civil law establishes a horizontal framework among members of society, and seeks to facilitate reparation of damages caused by one member of society towards another.

Civil and criminal law come together in certain cases, such as civil procedures which involve a criminal aspect. Although the goal of civil law is to compensate a victim via the awarding of damages, damages can have occurred during the commission of a criminal offense. Article 2 of the French penal code addresses this situation, and offers victims the option of suing for damages via a civil action in the criminal courts.

The two branches, civil and criminal, are mirrored in the types of actions a person or official may take in an attempt to right wrongs, namely civil action in the case of civil law, and public action in the case of criminal law. In a civil matter, someone who feels they are a victim of another member of society may identify themselves as a victim to judicial authorities, and seek compensation from the perpetrator.
A criminal matter is dealt with by a public action to punish the perpetrator. In particular, it is up to the public prosecutor to initiate this action on behalf of the public, and to seek punishment for the accused, rather than reparations.

History 

The Republic of France has had three penal codes: the code of 1791, the code of 1810, and the code of 1994, still in effect as of 2022.

Precursors 

The origins of criminal law go back to family justice, retribution for perceived offenses, and revenge. Private revenge was originally a way of maintaining a rough sort of social order among clans, with fear of revenge the deterrent factor. This created a certain respect for strangers and other clans, and when a settling of accounts was necessary, this could take place not only against a presumed perpetrator, but also against their family, the clan chief, or top clan members, so that criminal liability was originally collective and not individual.

With the Fall of the Roman Empire officials in charge of police disappeared. With the rise of feudalism in France, policing powers were dispersed among a multitude of seigneurs. Lords of their fiefs, they were all-powerful, including that of justice among the peasants they controlled.

As states evolved and gained power, private justice receded; the State was only involved insofar as procedural control of private revenge, to control excesses. France was influenced by the texts of Roman justice which were still available and studied, and by the thirteenth century, the state started to become more involved, and the previous system of private justice evolved into public justice, with the State assuming the power of suppression, targeting social wrongs rather than individual, private ones, in which private victims or plaintiffs became secondary to the state's role.

These private and public systems coexisted for a while. A crime could be seen as the failure of a monarch to keep the oath he took upon accession, to maintain peace in the kingdom, which justified the interest in public repression of crime, if the individuals concerned could not do so privately. By the sixteenth century, individuals sometimes had to seek permission from the monarch to engage in self-defense. This has further evolved today, to the point where self-defense is still permitted if one is in immediate danger, otherwise, it is allocated to the authorities. Revenge was no longer permitted to individuals, but appropriated by the monarch, based on their divine power.

Suspension of trial by ordeal 

In medieval France and elsewhere in Europe, trial by ordeal was an ancient judicial practice by which the guilt or innocence of an accused was determined, such as trial by battle, by fire, or water. The belief was that God determined the result, and presentation of evidence or witnesses played no part. This persisted for centuries, because people believed it worked, and there was no one (except the victim and the real perpetrator, who would remain silent) to say it didn't. But by the 12th century belief in it began to weaken, led by opposing views from the Church. Opposition became widespread, and in 1215 the Church condemned trial by ordeal in the Fourth Lateran Council. This meant priests could no longer use trial by ordeal to determine guilt or innocence, and other means had to be found.

The Church already had one other method, which hitherto had been used only for cases of offenses against the clergy, and for cases of suspected heresy, namely they would organize a commission of inquiry headed by some trustworthy individual to find out the facts. The investigator would question suspects and witnesses and write up a report. The ruling on guilt or innocence would be based on the written dossier. This formal investigation, or "inquisition", is the basis of the inquisitorial system in France. England took a different approach, summoning a group of people to answer the question of guilt or innocence formerly assigned to God, and this became the origin of trial by jury and the accusatorial system.

Church 

Development of the French criminal justice system has important roots in ecclesiastical law of the Roman Catholic Church. While England was moving towards the adversarial system of criminal justice, in France was laying the basis for the inquisitorial system. This goes back to the medieval church's efforts to investigate and eliminate heresies. In southern France of the 12th century for example, corruption and immoral behavior by clerics led to the establishment of various movements in response such as the Cathari, that the Church declared heretical, and authorized a Crusade against them at the Third Lateran Council. Despite this and much bloodshed, the movement grew. At the 1229 Council of Toulouse, Dominicans organized investigations into the heresy, attempting either to change their beliefs or stopping their proliferation; these were called inquisitions, and secular criminal procedure began to adapt the church methods into their own systems, and became the basis for the French inquisitorial system.

Maréchaussée 

French criminal justice goes back to the Maréchaussée in the Middle Ages.
From that time, and to a lesser extent until the end of the Ancien Régime, the functions of the police and the justice system were closely intertwined.
Kings, lords and high dignitaries rendered justice. In that sense, justice in the armies was part of the remit of the Grand Constable of France, who succeeded the Seneschal in 1191 as head of the armies, and of the Marshals of France, who were his lieutenants. The Grand Constable and the marshals delegated their powers to their provosts.

The enforcement bodies were the company of the Constabulary and the companies of the Maréchaussée. The  originally roamed the countryside catching and sentencing evildoers from among the military, and after 1536, among the civilian population as well. They also had the power to sentence perpetrators they had caught. There was no central organization, but they adopted the collective name  ("marshalcy") because the detachments were assigned to army marshals.

The Constabulary was eliminated in 1626 by Louis XIII and the Constabulary and Marshalcy Tribunal was placed under the command of the Marshal of France. According to the Criminal Ordinance of 1670, certain crimes identified as "royal cases" were investigated by the  but judged by a chamber of the Parliament dealing with criminal matters, while the others, identified as "provost cases", were judged by the 

A series of reforms in the 18th century were instituted to make the  more effective, reinforce its military character, and improve coverage in the countryside. The edict of 1720 accentuated its territorial nature and created a hierarchy under a provost court and a  detachment in each of the thirty-six governments or provinces, with a provost at the head of each one in the provincial capital. The provostships were divided into lieutenancies with a lieutenant in each city heading up a presidial court.

Late ancien régime 

Criminal law in the 16th to 18th centuries was fairly static, and had a basis in the growing awareness of Roman law during the Renaissance. Rulings generally followed the Roman Digest, except when local customs or written tracts clearly dealt with a speficic situation. Although French criminal lawyers were inspired by the Romans to write treatises on the law, the content was based more on local or feudal custom.

Criminal law was also influenced by Christianity, and by canon law. Ecclesiastical courts played an important role in the Middle Ages, and trials were held on any subject which the Church felt touched their domain (heresy, witchcraft, adultery, etc.), and cooperated with non-Church authorities in handing over the most serious offenders. The most original aspect of Church law was in the influence of sin and penitence; punishment was based in retribution. Where revenge was more about hurting individuals or groups based on a grievance, retribution was a sanction based on the moral responsibility of the offender, intended to expiate the wrong, and in proportion to the seriousness of the offense.

The age of the offender was taken into consideration in dispensing punishment, retaining the Roman distinction between infants, pre-pubescent, pubescent, and so on.

The guiding principle was retribution, not rehabilitation; the focus was on preserving the public order and the general population, while separating out and penalizing the bad portion. There was much regional variation in interpretation of criminal law, and also implementation of penalties, which tended to be harsh. Little was written, and the types of offenses and attendant penalties derived from custom; Roman texts were examined to determine what they were and how to proceed. The Criminal Ordinance of 1670 attempted to codify the customary practices, but it did not list specific offenses or their penalties, so it was unclear what activities were permitted, or the penalties if they were prosecuted. Judges retained arbitrary discretion to rule as they saw fit, including whether a defendant was guilty or not.  Since all power derived from the King, they had ultimate power to order an existing prosecution under the King's Seal to be quashed, or to circumvent the procedures and orders of judges and courts to convict and imprison an individual, even in the absence of guilt, or even commission of a crime; these orders were known as lettres de cachet.

French Revolution 

One of the signal events of the French Revolution was the declaration by the National Constituent Assembly on 4 August 1789 abolishing the feudal system in France. In November, this included suspension of the judicial system of the Ancien regime and its 13 regional parlements, followed by abolition in 1790. This led directly to the first formal codification of French law, including civil law, and criminal law.

Codification

Code of 1791 

The Penal Code of 1791 was adopted during the Revolution by the Constituent Assembly, between 25 September and 6 October 1791. It was France's first penal code, and was influenced by the Enlightenment thinking of Cesare Beccaria and Montesquieu.

Penal law in particular had been a source of great controversy during the French Revolution, which had promulgated the Penal Code of 1791 and numerous constitutions. An important feature of the 1791 code, as well as the 1795 Code of Offences and Penalties was to have fixed penalties to keep the role of judge strictly distributive, thereby eliminating the previous tradition of arbitrary sentencing.

Code of 1810 

The Penal code of 1810 was a code of criminal laws created under Napoleon, replacing the French Penal Code of 1791. It replaced various laws adopted during the first ten years of the Revolution, incliuding the 1791 code and the 1795 code of Offenses. With the 1810 penal code, sentences were given a set range, allowing judges more latitude to decide on the severity of the punishment. The 1810 code was revised twice: a major change in 1832, the second, much more limited, in 1863.

Code of 1994 

The current penal code is the codification of French criminal law. It took effect 1 March 1994 and replaced the French Penal Code of 1810, which had been in effect until then. This in turn became known as the "old penal code" for the rare decisions that still needed to refer to it.

The Penal Code project began with the work of the Commission for Revision created in 1974 by President Valéry Giscard d'Estaing. The 1978 draft of Book I (General Provisions) was heavily criticized by the criminal justice community and rejected by the government in 1980. After government changed hands in 1981, Robert Badinter, a former criminal lawyer who had become Minister of Justice, took over the commission. In 1989, François Mitterrand prioritized the project during his second term as president. The new penal code was passed by Parliament on 22 July 1992, followed by an amendment in December, and corrections in February 1994. It came into force on 1 March 1994.

Initially known as the new penal code, it was not so much a reform of the French Penal Code of 1810, but an original work with a new outline, new principles, a new formulation of the law, and even a new numbering system that is hierarchical instead of sequential.

Basic principles 

French criminal law is governed by the principle of legality and its three corollaries, the principle of strict interpretation of the law, the application of criminal law in time, and the application of criminal law in space.

Principle of legality 

The principle of legality is one of the most fundamental principles of French law, and goes back to the Penal Code of 1791 adopted during the Revolution.

. French legal publisher Dalloz describes it this way:

This principle is enshrined in the first chapter of the penal code, General Principles, in article 111–3.

Division of authority 

This is covered in the first chapter of the code, in article 111–2.

Application in time and space 

The principle of criminal liability is defined in the constitution, and a fundamental corollary of it is the application of the criminal law in time. This principle defines the non-retroactive nature of criminal sanctions, and is governed by article 112-1 of the penal code. The article defines the disposition in cases where acts were committed around the time a new law was taking effect.

Sources 

Sources of the penal code come from national (French) sources, and international sources, and come from written and unwritten (judicial, praetorian) sources.  Written sources include the Constitution, the Preamble, and various penal codes, including some going back to the Revolution, or even for example the 1539 ordinance under Francois I mandating the use of the French language.
The main source of criminal law is the penal code: it "expresses a value system  allowing one to distinguish what is permitted from what is prohibited, and to measure the level of tolerance of a transgression of social norms".

Today, the  tend more and more to be international, under the influence of jurisprudence in European courts such as the Court of Justice of the European Union (CJEU) and the European Court of Human Rights (CEDH).

Infractions

Definitions

Infraction 

An  (offense) is conduct prohibited by the criminal law and punishable by a penalty specified in the law.

Limitation periods are longer for offenses against minors.

Crime 

 are the most serious offenses.

Examples: rape; procuring; torture; inhumane working conditions; slavery; homicide; genocide; crimes against humanity; robbery with violence; receiving stolen goods; etc.

Before 1981, crimes were subject to the  The types of crimes most frequently tried in France are homicide, rape, and armed robbery.

Délit 

 are an intermediate level which covers various categories of offenses. They fall under the jurisdiction of the Tribunal correctionnel and may be tried by a panel of judges or by a single judge. Other correctional penalties include the day-fine; citizenship training; and community service.

Examples: theft; sexual assault; embezzlement; witness tampering; contempt of court; influence peddling.

The tripartite division of infractions in French law does not line up well with concepts in common law, and translations of  into English vary. Some terms seen include: felony, major offense, intermediate offense, minor offense, minor crime, and misdemeanor. Many English sources describe the term on first appearance, and then just refer to it using the French term after that.

Contravention 

Contraventions are divided into five classes according to their severity. The fine incurred does not exceed €3,000. 

Examples: defamation, defacing or destruction of property; failure to respond to a summons; minor violence; trespassing on school property.

Components 

An  comprises three components:
 the legal basis for pursuing a criminal case;

Legal basis 

The first of the three components is the legal basis for pursuing a criminal case. The public prosecutor or other investigating official must establish the legal basis for charging someone with an offense. This consists of describing the acts committed, and identifying the specific legal text purported to have been violated in the commission of these acts, as required by the principle of legality in French criminal law.

Material element 

This is the visible, external part of the offense, i.e., the actions involved in carrying out a criminal act. It can be an act, a gesture, something written, a spoken word, aiming to harm an interest protected by the law. It is known in some common law systems as the actus reus of an offense.

Moral element 

The  is one of the three components of an offense, and refers to the psychological attitude of the perpetrator towards the commission of the acts deemed to be punishable by criminal law. The perpetrator may have acted with intent, or through recklessness or negligence. Without the moral element, there is no offense.  only require evidence of voluntary action by the perpetrator. Known in some common law systems as the mens rea of an offense.

Article 121-3 of the Criminal Code says:

Courts 

Courts involved in adjudicating questions of French criminal law are organized in three tiers.

In the first instance, there are the Police court, the Correctional tribunal, and the Cour d'assises. The Police court hears  (minor criminal offenses). The Criminal court (also known as Correctional court) hears , less serious felonies and misdemeanors. The Court of Assizes sits in each of the departments of France and is normally composed of three judges and six jurors, and has jurisdiction over more serious .

In the second instance : the Court of appeal, and the Appeal court of assizes.  When it sits as a court of appeal, the Court of Assizes is composed of three judges and nine jurors, or seven judges alone.

In the last resort: the Court of Cassation, located in Paris, is the highest level of appeal in France and hears appeals from the assize courts and the courts of appeal.

Procedure 

A complaint by a victim or a law enforcement official is the initial step in launching a criminal investigation.

Investigation 

Criminal procedure starts with the investigation phase. The investigation has two parts: the preliminary police investigation and the in-depth investigation under the supervision of the court.

The preliminary police investigation takes place under supervision of the public prosecutor's office. In this phase, the police make inquiries in order to determine if a crime has been committed, and attempt to find a suspect.

In the second phase, the in-depth investigation is carried out to see if there is enough evidence to warrant prosecution. The second part is normally carried out by the prosecutor, or in some serious cases, by the investigating judge.

Defendants in a criminal case cannot plead guilty. A defendant may confess to a crime, but this becomes one more piece of evidence that can be used against them. Plea bargaining does not exist.

Sanctions

Background 
The concept of punishment for offenses has its origins in the Declaration of the Rights of Man, article 8. The Declaration is recognized in the Preamble to the French Constitution, and is invested with constitutional power, due to the 1971 Liberty of Association decision of the Constitutional Council, which said:

This principle, also known by its Latin name, is common to democratic states and considered fundamental to the rule of law, and was elucidated by Italian jurist Cesare Beccaria in his 1764 On Crimes and Punishments.

Sentencing 

Judges are given wide latitude to pronounce sentence on a defendant found guilty of a criminal offense, within the range provided by statutes covering each of the three categories of offense. Seriousness of the offense, quality of the evidence, attitude of the defendant, and other factors may be taken into account by the judge. The judge may assign probation, at their discretion, and a  assigns someone to supervise the parolee. Probationary terms may be up to three years. All sentences may be appealed.

Alternative sentences may be imposed, such as performing . If the perpetrator admits guilt, prosecutors have the option of imposing a  such as a fine or community service, which goes on their criminal record but is not considered a conviction. Alternatives to incarceration arose initially from local initiatives, and have become a more mainstream path to clearing the prosecutorial docket. In 1994, only 10% of prosecutorial decisions resulted in an alternative sentence, but in 2000 they were one third, and by 2012 almost one half.

Penalties 

The penalty, or criminal sanction, is the corollary of the offense. Since October, 2014, Article 130-1 of the Penal Code has defined the two main functions of criminal sanctions as: "to punish the perpetrator, and to promote their reform, reintegration, or rehabilitation."

There are also different courts of first instance to deal with each of them.

Contraventions, such as minor traffic offenses, minor assualts, noise problems, and other petty offenses are punished with fines.

 are more serious offenses, some of which carry a term of imprisonment, which may be from six months to ten years, and may be accompanied by fines. These include theft, manslaughter, assault, drug offenses, and serious traffic offenses such as driving while intoxicated.

Formerly, capital punishment was the most severe penalty, but it was abolished in 1981, and became unconstitutional in 2007.

Influence of politics 

Attitudes toward criminal sanctions is a political issue in France, and laws and sentencing may be affected by the political winds, as laws established under one administration are later modified or undone by a later administration with different political objectives and other laws are established. Issues such as prison overcrowding, perspective of the victim, recidivism, non-custodial alternatives to incarceration, and being "tough on crime" are part of the public debate. These issues rose to the level of presidential politics in the election of 2012. Sentencing policies and related legislation ebb and flow with the party in power. For example, the 2014 law on the individualization of penalties was introduced in 2012 by newly elected Socialist Party president François Hollande to reform mandatory minimum sentences introduced earlier under right-wing president Nicolas Sarkozy, under whose administration the prison population rose from 48,000 to 64,000. In response, a Consensus Commission was established under the PS in 2012 in order to reduce recidivism. The commission's report was opposed by interior minister Manuel Valls who favored building more prisons and increasing incarceration, while justice minister Christiane Taubira favored greater use of alternative sentencing and sending fewer people to prison.

See also 

 Classical school (criminology)
 Code of Offences and Penalties
 Codification (law)
 Cour d'appel (Appellate court), procedures in common law vs. French jurisdictions
 Court of Appeal (France) – differs considerably from common law appeal court procedures.
 Court of Cassation – general scope, does not discuss France specifically
 Criminal justice system of France
 Declaration of the Rights of Man and of the Citizen
 French penal code
 , magistrate, co-author of the penal code project
 Glossary of French criminal law
 International criminal law
 Law of France
 Napoleonic Code – civil, not criminal
 Nulla poena sine lege

References 

Notes

Footnotes

Works cited

Further reading 

 
 
 
  Lay version

External links 
 France: Penal Code of 1810

Criminal codes

Government of France
Legal history of France